Pacific Highway is the name of several north–south highways in the Pacific Coast region of the Western United States, either by legislation officially designating it as such or by common usage.

Description
Good roads advocate and road-building pioneer Sam Hill was perhaps the main motivating force behind building the original Pacific Highway as a "national auto trail"; from Blaine, Washington, on the Canada–US border, where he would build his Peace Arch, through Oregon to the Siskiyou Mountains of northwestern California. The road was built in the early 20th century—long before the United States Numbered Highway System was established. In 1926, its  of pavement made it the longest continuous stretch of paved road in the world at the time. The Pacific Highway later extended north to Vancouver, British Columbia, and south through San Francisco to San Diego in Southern California.

The Pacific Highway auto trail became British Columbia Highway 99 from Vancouver to the Canada–United States border, U.S. Route 99 from the border to Red Bluff, California, in the Sacramento Valley; U.S. Route 99W from Red Bluff to Davis, California, in the Central Valley; U.S. Route 40 from Davis to San Francisco; and U.S. Route 101 from San Francisco to San Diego. This alignment is now mostly Interstate 5 in California, except between Woodland, and Los Angeles, where it uses State Route 113, Interstate 80 and then U.S. Route 101. Several routes are named Pacific Highway. 

In Oregon, Interstate 5 is now officially the Pacific Highway No. 1 (see Oregon highways and routes). First completed in 1923, Oregon's Pacific Highway was the first border-to-border paved highway west of the Mississippi River.

In California, Interstate 5  (Oregon's Pacific Highway) immediately becomes the Cascade Wonderland Highway as soon as  it crosses the border, as far as Red Bluff, south of  Redding. South from there, it takes on other names such as West Side Freeway or Golden State Freeway, through southern California. The name "Pacific Highway"  only currently corresponds with I-5, for a limited stretch of Interstate 5, in Oregon and part of Washington, but not in California.  An old freeway section of U.S. Route 101 parallel to Interstate 5 near the San Diego International Airport is known as "Pacific Highway," and is now locally maintained.

History
An extensive section of the Pacific Highway (over ), from approximately Stockton, California to Vancouver, Washington, followed very closely the track of the Siskiyou Trail. The Siskiyou Trail was based on an ancient network of Native American footpaths connecting the Pacific Northwest with California's Central Valley.

By the 1820s, trappers from the Hudson's Bay Company were the first non-Native Americans to use the route of the future Pacific Highway to move between today's state of Washington and "Alta California". During the second half of the 19th Century, mule trains, stagecoaches, and the Central Pacific Railroad also followed the route of the Siskiyou Trail.

In the early 20th century,  around 1910, entrepreneur Sam Hill lobbied the governments of Washington and Oregon to build automobile roads along the path of the Siskiyou Trail, with the ultimate goal of building a paved auto route from Canada to Mexico.

See also

Notes

References

External links

 Official Museum of the Siskiyou Trail website
 'Control Cities' of the Pacific Highway auto trail
 The historic Pacific Highway in Washington

Auto trails in the United States
Named highways in California
Historic trails and roads in California
Named state highways in Oregon
State highways in Oregon
Roads in British Columbia
Roads in Washington (state)
Pacific